The following are the national records in Olympic weightlifting in Denmark. Records are maintained in each weight class for the snatch lift, clean and jerk lift, and the total for both lifts by the Dansk Vægtløftnings-Forbund (DVF).

Current records

Men

Women

Historical records

Men (1998–2018)

Women (1998–2018)

Notes

References
General
Danish Records 12 December 2022 updated
Specific

External links
DVF web site

records
Denmark
Olympic weightlifting
weightlifting